Lytchett may refer to the following places in England:

 Lytchett Bay, part of Poole Harbour, Dorset
 Lytchett Heath
 Lytchett Matravers
 Lytchett Minster, a village in Dorset
 Lytchett Minster and Upton, a civil parish in Dorset